Temera  is a small town and commune on the north bank of the Niger River in the Cercle of Bourem in the Gao Region of south-eastern Mali. As of the 2009 census, the commune had a population of 20,363.

References

Communes of Gao Region
Communities on the Niger River